The 2014 MNL-2 New Holland League is the second edition of MNL-2. The first round of the season began on 1 February and ended on 28 March. 
The schedule for the second round will be released after completion of the first round. The two guest teams taking part in MNL-2 will not be qualified to either MNL or MFF Cup.

To MNL-2

Promoted from

 No team will be promoted until the introduction of MNL-3 in coming years.

Relegated from MNL

 Hantharwady United
 Rakhine United

From MNL-2

Promoted to MNL

 TBD

Relegation

It is understood that MFF is in the process of establishing a third-tier league, MNL-3 in coming years. Until then no team will be relegated.

Teams

The 2014 MNL-2 season will have 10 teams playing for promotion to the Myanmar National League. The teams are:-

 Best United FC
 Horizon FC
 Hantharwady United
 Mawyawadi FC
 Myawady FC
 Rakhine United
 Myanmar U-19 (guest team)
 Dagon FC
 Silver Stars FC
 University FC (guest team)

Stadium 
Matches are planned to play in Salin Stadium and Padonmar Stadium with a League cup format.

League table

Season statistics

Top scorers
As of Week-6

See also
 2014 Myanmar National League
 2014 MFF Cup

References

External links
Myanmar Football Federation:MNL-2
Myanmar Football Federation:Amateur League
Myanmar National League:MNL-2 Table
Soccer Myanmar

MNL-2 seasons
2
Burma
Burma